Stuck in a Groove is the sole studio album released by Australian electronica music producer Josh G Abrahams under the alias Puretone. It was released in 2002 by record label Festival Mushroom in Australia, V2 in the US and Sony in the UK. It contains Puretone's 1998 top-20 single "Addicted to Bass" and features collaborations with Amiel Daemion, Dan the Automator and Paul Mac.

The album includes a number of tracks from Abraham's 1998 album, Sweet Distorted Holiday.

Content 
Billboard described the album as "musically diverse [...] revelling in drum and bass, techno, chilled out ambience, and left-of-center pop".

Reception 

Richard M. Juzwiak of CMJ New Music Monthly wrote: "Groove excites because it sprawls, not only over the course of the tracks, but within them, suggesting that Abrahams is anything but stuck."

Track listing

References

External links 

 

2002 albums
Josh Abrahams albums